David Howard Murdock (born April 11, 1923) is an American billionaire businessman, plant-based diet advocate and philanthropist.

Early career
Murdock was born on April 11, 1923, in Kansas City, Missouri. His father was a traveling salesman; his mother worked as a laundress and housekeeper to make ends meet. He is the middle child of three; he had two sisters. He was close to his mother, who died at 42 of cancer. He grew up in Montgomery Township, Ohio, and dropped out of high school in the 9th grade. He was drafted by the United States Army in 1943 during World War II.

Upon relocating to Detroit after the war, Murdock was homeless and destitute.  Due to a chance encounter with a good samaritan, he obtained a $1,200 loan to buy a closing diner, flipping it for a $700 profit ten months later. He moved to Phoenix, Arizona, and began working there, first in housing and then commercial real estate.

When the real estate market collapsed in the 1960s, he moved to Los Angeles where he continued developing real estate opportunities, leading to a string of acquisitions. In 1978 he acquired control of International Mining. In early 1980s he became the largest shareholder in L.A.-based Occidental Petroleum, by selling the corporation his 18% share of the Iowa Beef Packers company.

Businesses
Murdock purchased Cannon Mills in Kannapolis, North Carolina in 1982. At the time, the company was profitable and had no debts. He used the company's profits to pay back the loans he secured to make the acquisition before terminating 2,000 positions and selling the company-owned homes. He eliminated the company's $100 million pensions plan, taking $36 million to make personal investments and using the remainder to purchase annuity policies from Executive Life Insurance Company for Cannon employees. Executive Life later failed due to its own poor investments and reduced its payouts to retired employees. Murdock sold the Cannon Mills to Fieldcrest in 1985.

In 1985 Murdock took over the nearly bankrupt Hawaiian firm Castle & Cooke, which owned pineapple and banana producer Dole Food Company. He developed Castle & Cooke's real estate portfolio into residential and commercial properties and turned Dole into the world's largest producer of fruits and vegetables. Acquiring Dole privately in 2003, Murdock completed a $446 million initial public offering in October 2009 and the company traded on the New York Stock Exchange under the ticker DOLE until a private merger agreement was approved October 31, 2013. As a result of his purchase of Castle & Cooke, Murdock acquired ownership of 98% of Lana'i, the sixth-largest island in Hawaii. In June 2012 Murdock sold his interest in Lana'i to Larry Ellison. He owns other companies, including Pacific Clay.

Philanthropy
He has helped contribute to the redevelopment of a  complex in Kannapolis, North Carolina, of a biotechnology research center, the North Carolina Research Campus.  The research center is a joint public-private venture, involving major North Carolina universities and private investment. The site of the research center in the middle of Kannapolis was formerly occupied by Plant #1 of Cannon Mills (which became Pillowtex after a series of mergers and acquisitions).  Pillowtex filed for bankruptcy in 2003, and closed the mill. This resulted in the largest mass layoff of workers in North Carolina history. Murdock acquired the site and demolished the mill in 2006.

Since the death of his third wife, Gabriele, he has been involved to finding a cure for cancer, advancing nutrition, and life extension. He established the Dole Nutrition Institute to advocate the benefits of a plant-based diet to promote health and prevent disease. With the help of UCLA, he oversaw the writing of the Encyclopedia of Foods, A Guide to Healthy Nutrition. In 2006, he opened the California Health and Longevity Institute (CHLI).

Murdock has contributed more than $500 million toward the creation of the North Carolina Research Campus and David H. Murdock Research Institute which research the health benefits of plants in boosting longevity and reducing disease risk.

Personal life

He has been married six times. In 1967, he married his third wife, Gabriele; they had two children together and he also adopted her son from a previous marriage, Eugene. Gabriele was diagnosed with ovarian cancer in 1983 and died in 1985. A year later, Eugene died after hitting his head while swimming in the family estate's swimming pool. In 2004 his son David Jr. died in an auto accident on the Santa Monica Freeway. His remaining son Justin serves as CEO and executive chairman of NovaRx and is senior vice president of investments for Castle & Cooke. Previously, Justin was a director at the Dole Food Company, as well as their audit and finance committee until his retirement on May 17, 2013. In 2011, Forbes ranked David Sr. as the 190th-richest person in the "Forbes 400" list and 613th in the "World's Billionaires" list, with a net worth of US$2.4 billion as of March 2013.

Since 1985 Murdock has been a pescetarian and promotes a plant-based diet that is high in fruits and vegetables. He drinks smoothies two or three times a day with as many as twenty fruits and vegetables, including pulverized banana and orange peels. He eats fish, seafood, egg whites, legumes and nuts whilst avoiding dairy, poultry and red meat. He also shuns the use of alcohol, processed sugar and salt. Murdock does not take vitamin supplements and claims he can live to 125 years on his plant-based diet.

Selected publications

The Dole Nutrition Handbook: What to Eat and How to Live for a Longer, Healthier Life (2010)

References

1923 births
20th-century American businesspeople
21st-century American businesspeople
American billionaires
American business executives
American food industry business executives
American food writers
American real estate businesspeople
Businesspeople from Kansas City, Missouri
Businesspeople from Los Angeles
Businesspeople from North Carolina
Dole plc
HuffPost writers and columnists
Life extensionists
Living people
People from Kannapolis, North Carolina
People from Wood County, Ohio
Plant-based diet advocates
United States Army personnel of World War II